Pocasset River may refer to a stream in southern New England in the United States:

Pocasset River (Massachusetts)
Pocasset River (Rhode Island)